Mohamed Abdulkhalek El Sayed (28 October 1898 – 20 January 1992) was an Egyptian diplomat who served as the second Secretary-General of the Arab League

Life and career

Born in Cairo in 1898, Abdel-Khalek Hassouna was the grandson of Al-Azhar Grand Sheikh Hassouna El-Nawawi.  Hassouna Pasha as he was later known obtained his masters and doctorate degrees in economics and political science from the University of Cambridge in 1925, where he was a member of Magdalene College. He was a member of the first mission sent abroad by the Ministry of Foreign Affairs. He served at the Egyptian embassies in Berlin, Rome, Prague and Stockholm.

Hassouna served as governor of Alexandria from 1942 to 1948, during which time the University of Alexandria was completed. He served as social affairs minister between 1949 and 1950 and then Minister of education and foreign affairs.

He succeeded Abdul Rahman Hassan Azzam at the Arab League in 1952  and served for the next 20 years. He was succeeded by Mahmoud Riad in 1972, and died on 20 January 1992.

Honour

Foreign honour
  : 
 Honorary Commander of the Order of the Defender of the Realm (PMN (K)) - Tan Sri (1965)

References

1898 births
1992 deaths
Alumni of Magdalene College, Cambridge
Diplomats from Cairo
Secretaries General of the Arab League
Honorary Commanders of the Order of the Defender of the Realm
Governors of Alexandria